The 2016–17 Euro Hockey League was the tenth season of the Euro Hockey League, Europe's premier club field hockey tournament organized by the EHF. Round One was held in Banbridge, Northern Ireland. the round of 16 and quarterfinals in Eindhoven, Netherlands and the semi-finals, third place game and the final were held in Brasschaat, Belgium.

Qualified teams

Round one
Round One was played in Banbridge, Northern Ireland between 7 and 19 October 2016. In each group, teams played against each other once in a round-robin format. The pool winners advanced to the round of 16. If a game was won, the winning team received 5 points. A draw resulted in both teams receiving 2 points. A loss gave the losing team 1 point unless the losing team lost by 3 or more goals, then they received 0 points.

Pool A

Pool B

Pool C

Pool D

Knockout stage
The round of 16 and the quarter-finals were played in Eindhoven, Netherlands between 14 and 17 April 2017. Semi-finals, third place match and the final were played in Brasschaat, Belgium on 3 and 4 June 2017.

Bracket

Source

Round of 16

Quarter-finals

Semi-finals

Bronze medal match

Final

See also
2017 EuroHockey Club Champions Cup
2017 Men's EuroHockey Indoor Club Cup

References

Euro Hockey League
2016–17 in European field hockey